.sic is a proposed top-level domain for the Domain Name System of the Internet. It is as an abbreviation of Siculitas (Székely), a historic region in Transylvania, and was requested in 2009 by an initiative of the Szekler National Council for presenting Szeklerland on the Internet. The application was accepted by ICANN on May 13, 2009.

References

External links
Website (archived 2012-07-12)

Proposed top-level domains